eXtensible Text Framework (XTF) is a programming and data representation framework created and maintained by the California Digital Library (CDL) based on XML data, XSLT 2.0, and Java. 

It has primarily been developed and used to present Encoded Archival Description (EAD) finding aids that describe analog and digital archival collections.

External links

XML
Software frameworks
Archival science